Wesley Charles Jacobs Jr. (also known as Wesley Chuck Jacobs) is an American rural planner, who, as an Oglala Lakota, works in South Dakota for the First Nation's Financial Project.

He graduated from University of Massachusetts Amherst with a Master's in Rural Planning, in 1984.

In 1987, Jacobs received the MacArthur Fellows Program award with grant for his work as 

From 2008 to 2010, Jacobs represented the Oglala Sioux Tribe on the board of directors of the Intertribal Bison Cooperative.

References

Oglala people
University of Massachusetts Amherst College of Social and Behavioral Sciences alumni
MacArthur Fellows
Year of birth missing (living people)
Living people